Mario Tudor (born 13 July 1978) is a Croatian former professional tennis player.

Tudor reached best world rankings of 601 in singles and 385 in doubles. His best performance on the ATP Tour was a quarter-final appearance at the 1997 Croatian Indoors. In 2001 he was the training partner for Goran Ivanišević's Wimbledon win and played doubles with him that year at the Stuttgart Masters.

Since 2019 he has coached Canadian player Milos Raonic.

References

External links
 
 

1978 births
Living people
Croatian male tennis players
Croatian tennis coaches